The 1967 FA Cup final was the 86th final of the FA Cup. It took place on 20 May 1967 at Wembley Stadium and was contested between Tottenham Hotspur and Chelsea. It was the first FA Cup Final to be contested between two teams from London, and is thus often dubbed the "Cockney Cup Final".

Tottenham won the match 2–1 at Wembley, their 5th triumph and third of the decade. Jimmy Robertson and Frank Saul scored Tottenham's goals, before Bobby Tambling scored a consolation for Chelsea. The match referee was Ken Dagnall from Lancashire.

Match details

Summary
Spurs took the lead in the 40th minute, Jimmy Robertson scoring with a low right-footed strike from the edge of the penalty area.
Tottenham continued to control the match in the second period, and scored a second goal midway through the half. Robertson was again involved, helping on a long throw from Dave Mackay that Frank Saul turned into the net with his right foot to the goalkeeper's left. Bobby Tambling headed Chelsea's goal in the 85th minute after a cross from the right which was missed by Pat Jennings.

See also
Chelsea F.C.–Tottenham Hotspur F.C. rivalry

References

External links
Line-ups
Cup final video

FA Cup Finals
Final
FA Cup Final
FA Cup Final 1967
FA Cup Final 1967
FA Cup Final